Almost Always Never is the third album by British blues rock artist Joanne Shaw Taylor. It was released on 17 September 2012 on Ruf Records.

Track listing
"Soul Station" (Joanne Shaw Taylor) – 6:16
"Beautifully Broken" (Joanne Shaw Taylor) – 5:48
"You Should Stay, I Should Go" (Joanne Shaw Taylor) – 4:09
"Piece Of The Sky" (Joanne Shaw Taylor / Kevin Bowe) – 3:51
"Army Of One" (Joanne Shaw Taylor) – 5:15
"Jealousy" (Frankie Miller) – 6:49
"Almost Always Never" (Joanne Shaw Taylor) – 3:51
"Tied & Bound" (Joanne Shaw Taylor) – 6:11
"A Hand In Love" (Joanne Shaw Taylor) – 3:39
"Standing To Fall" (Joanne Shaw Taylor) – 6:47
"Maybe Tomorrow" (Joanne Shaw Taylor) – 6:31
"Lose Myself To Loving You" (Joanne Shaw Taylor) – 5:25

Personnel
Joanne Shaw Taylor – All electric guitars, vocals, and Gordon on tracks 4 and 12.
David Garza – Piano, Wurti, Rhodes, RMI, Hammond, Mandolin, and Gordon.
Billy White – Precision bass, and acoustic slide.
J.J. Johnson – All drums.

References

2012 albums
Joanne Shaw Taylor albums